Biman Bangladesh Airlines Flight 147 was a scheduled flight from Shahjalal International Airport, Bangladesh, to Dubai International Airport, United Arab Emirates, via Chittagong. The crew performed an emergency landing at the Shah Amanat International Airport in Chittagong where Ahmed was shot dead by Bangladeshi special forces. One flight attendant was shot at during the hijacking, but there were no other reported casualties among the 134 passengers and 14 crew on board.

Aircraft 
The Boeing 737-8E9 aircraft (MSN: 40335/5715) registered S2-AHV was built in 2015 and first flew on December 11, 2015. The aircraft was the second of the type delivered new to Biman Bangladesh Airlines from Boeing in late 2015. At the time of the hijacking, the aircraft was 3 years and 3 months old.

Events

Prior to hijacking 
According to FlightAware, S2-AHV was flying its third flight of the day as Flight 147. It had previously flown a round trip between Shahjalal International Airport and Shah Amanat International Airport, and a special flight carrying Prime Minister of Bangladesh Sheikh Hasina to Chittagong, on that day. The aircraft was serviced and flight and cabin crew were changed, and just under two hours later at 17:13, the aircraft departed for Dubai.

Hijacking 
Cabin crew noticed the perpetrator acting strangely for most of the flight; he was supposedly armed with a toy pistol. The plane diverted and performed an emergency landing. Passengers were evacuated. The suspected hijacker was identified as a man in his mid-20s who demanded to speak with his wife, and Prime Minister Sheikh Hasina.

Assault 
The 737 was boarded by Bangladeshi special forces who demanded that the hijacker drop his weapon. When the hijacker failed to comply, he was shot dead. It is not known how many shots were fired.

Hijacker
The Rapid Action Battalion identified the hijacker as Polash Ahmed of Narayanganj after his fingerprints matched with those of a person in the criminal database. He was previously accused in an abduction case filed on February 22, 2012. He used Mahibi Jahan as his Facebook profile name.

He was the former husband of National Film Award winning actress Shimla; the couple divorced in November 2018. He had a two-year-old son from an earlier marriage.

References

External links 
Hijacking description at the Aviation Safety Network

Accidents and incidents involving the Boeing 737 Next Generation
2019 in Bangladesh
Aircraft hijackings in Asia
February 2019 crimes in Asia
Hostage taking
Aviation accidents and incidents in 2019
2019 in aviation
2019 crimes in Bangladesh
Biman Bangladesh Airlines
Biman Bangladesh Airlines accidents and incidents